is a Japanese manga series by . It was serialized in the  manga magazine Dear+ from December 14, 2010, to May 14, 2012. The series was later renewed and published in the Spring 2014 issue of Chéri+, where it continues to be serialized irregularly. A live-action television drama adaptation was broadcast from December 15, 2022 to February 10, 2023.

Plot

Originally a reporter for politics, journalist Satoshi Onoe is suddenly transferred to the celebrity gossip section in the weekly tabloid magazine Dash! and paired with photographer Motoharu Kaburagi, who Onoe views as his rival, as his partner for stake-outs. Onoe and Kaburagi constantly clash with each other from many factors such as Onoe's strong sense of justice, Kaburagi's two-faced and unethical methods of gathering information, and Onoe's ex-girlfriend choosing Kaburagi over him. Over time, Onoe comes to respect Kaburagi as he understands him more, while Kaburagi values Onoe's innocent outlook over journalism. The two eventually fall in love as they continue working together.

Characters

; 
Onoe is a reporter for Dash! and has a straight-laced personality. He has a strong sense of justice.

; 
Kaburagi works as a photographer in Dash!, and while he has a cool composure, he also has a kind side that allows him to show consideration for others. Unlike Onoe, Kaburagi will do anything for a scoop and maintains his connections through deceit, bribery, and sex to obtain information. Kaburagi admires Onoe's innocent outlook on journalism and hopes that he will not become as jaded as he is.

Media

Manga

It is serialized in the  manga magazine Dear+ from the January 2011 issue released on December 14, 2010 to the June 2012 issue released on May 14, 2012. Natsume resumed the series beginning with the Spring 2014 issue of Chéri+ released on April 30, 2014, where it continues to be serialized irregularly. The chapters were later released in six bound volumes by Shinshokan under the Dear+ Comics imprint.

Isaku Natsume Fanbook, a collection featuring Natsume's  works published with Shinshokan, was released on November 30, 2013 and included extra comics consisting of crossovers with Dōshiyō mo Nai Keredo and Tight Rope, her other works. In 2015, the release of vol. 3  of Candy Color Paradox was included in a promotional event where first-press editions were distributed with an extra comic. The first press bonus also included a ticket that allowed customers to apply to purchase an audio drama CD adaptation of Natsume's latest work at the time, Heart no Kakurega. In late October 2015, Natsume's artwork for Candy Color Paradox, as well as Heart no Kakurega, had a feature exhibition at Yurindo Comic Kingdom at Yokohama Station.

On September 15, 2017, Dear+ announced that the  versions will be released with a new cover design starting with volume 4. The covers for volumes 1 to 3 were also redesigned with new artwork following the announcement.

On August 1, 2018, Viz Media announced that they had licensed the series for North American distribution in English under their SuBLime imprint.

Drama CD

Several audio dramas based on each volume of Candy Color Paradox was released by Shinshokan on CD, starring Takashi Kondō as Onoe and Tomoaki Maeno as Kaburagi. The first drama CD was released on July 30, 2011. The second drama CD was released on November 28, 2012. The third drama CD was released on February 26, 2016.

OVA

Candy Color Paradox: (Secret) Tape was included as part of 6 Lovers, a compilation DVD featuring six anime shorts based on the series from Dear+ as part of the magazine's 20th anniversary. 6 Lovers was released on March 30, 2021. The short stars Yusuke Shirai as Onoe and Junta Terashima as Kaburagi.

Television drama

On November 13, 2022, Flag Pictures announced that they were producing a live-action television drama adaptation of Candy Color Paradox with 8 episodes planned. The series premiered on December 15, 2022 as the fifth entry of MBS' Drama Shower programming block, with other broadcasts on TV Kanagawa, Gunma TV, Tochigi TV, TV Saitama, and Chiba TV. The series is also streamed on Viki and GagaOOLala for English distribution.

The drama adaptation stars Fantastics from Exile Tribe member  as Onoe and  member  as Kaburagi. The opening theme is "Go Sign" by Billy Laurent and the ending theme is "Finder" by Claquepot. As the series was broadcast, exclusive behind-the-scenes footage was uploaded weekly on Tunku's (Kadokawa's label for live-action  dramas) Niconico channel.

Isaku Natsume was involved in the scriptwriting process, stating that the writing team had included her opinions in their revisions. Kimura and Yamanaka were familiar with each other after guest-starring in the live-action television drama adaptation of Yakuza Lover together, and Candy Color Paradox is not only their first time starring together, but their first time starring in lead roles. Kimura was instructed by the director to act as though he were having a normal conversation and thus gave a realistic portrayal of Onoe. Kimura also ad-libbed an unspecified scene through gestures.

Reception

In December 2022, a cumulative total of over 1.3 million physical copies have been sold in Japan. Media outlets such as Da Vinci and Right Stuf reviewed Candy Color Paradox favorably, stating that the series shows off the appeal of having a bickering couple while also showing that they can come to an understanding and fall in love because of it. In 2016, Candy Color Paradox ranked no. 9 in a list of recommended  titles based on a survey of bookstore employees nationwide in Japan. Rebecca Silverman from Anime News Network praised the story and art, but she also claimed that readers may find the story rushed at times and Onoe irritating.

References

External links 

  

2010 manga
2022 Japanese television series debuts
Japanese boys' love television series
Japanese television dramas based on manga
Josei manga
Shinshokan manga
SuBLime manga
Yaoi anime and manga
2020s Japanese LGBT-related television series